Incarcha aporalis is a species of snout moth. It was described by Harrison Gray Dyar Jr. in 1910.

References

Epipaschiinae
Moths of South America
Taxa named by Harrison Gray Dyar Jr.
Moths described in 1910